Bushmaster, in comics, may refer to:

 Bushmaster (Marvel Comics), two Marvel supervillains
 Bushmaster (DC Comics), a DC Comics character

See also
Bushmaster (disambiguation)